Abraham Grace Merritt (January 20, 1884 – August 21, 1943) – known by his byline, A. Merritt – was an American Sunday magazine editor and a writer of fantastic fiction.

The Science Fiction and Fantasy Hall of Fame inducted him in 1999, its fourth class of two deceased and two living writers.

Life
Born in Beverly, New Jersey, he moved to Philadelphia, Pennsylvania in 1894. Originally trained in law, he turned to journalism, first as a correspondent and later as editor. According to Peter Haining, Merritt survived a harrowing experience while a young reporter at The Philadelphia Inquirer about which he refused to ever speak, but would, as Haining claims, mark a turning point in Merritt's life. He was assistant editor of The American Weekly from 1912 to 1937 under Morrill Goddard, then its editor from 1937 until his death. As editor, he hired the unheralded new artists Virgil Finlay and Hannes Bok and promoted the work done on polio by Sister Elizabeth Kenny.

His fiction, eight complete novels and a number of short stories, was only a sideline to his journalism career. One of the best-paid journalists of his era, Merritt made $25,000 per year by 1919, and at the end of his life was earning $100,000 yearly—exceptional sums for the period. His financial success allowed him to pursue world travel—he invested in real estate in Jamaica and Ecuador—and exotic hobbies, like cultivating orchids and plants linked to witchcraft and magic (monkshood, wolfbane, blue datura, peyote, and cannabis).

He was described as a hypochondriac who talked endlessly about his medical symptoms, and showed eccentric behavior like a need to try out any food, tobacco and medicine he found on his coworkers desks. Occasionally he would dress in a kilt and play serenades for his coworkers with some of his huge collection of instruments he kept in a locked closet at work. He was well liked for his fairness and inability to fire any employees.

Merritt married twice, once in the 1910s to Eleanore Ratcliffe, with whom he raised an adopted daughter, and again in the 1930s to Eleanor H. Johnson. He lived in the Hollis Park Gardens neighborhood of Queens, New York City, where he accumulated collections of weapons, carvings, and primitive masks from his travels, as well as a library of occult literature that reportedly exceeded 5000 volumes. He died suddenly of a heart attack, at his winter home in Indian Rocks Beach, Florida, in 1943.

Writing

Merritt's writings were heavily influenced by H. Rider Haggard, Robert W. Chambers, Helena Blavatsky and Gertrude Barrows Bennett (writing as Francis Stevens), with Merritt having "emulated Bennett's earlier style and themes." Merritt's stories typically revolve around conventional pulp magazine themes: lost civilizations, hideous monsters, etc. His heroes are gallant Irishmen or Scandinavians, his villains treacherous Germans or Russians and his heroines often virginal, mysterious and scantily clad.

What sets Merritt apart from the typical pulp author, however, is his lush, florid prose style and his exhaustive, at times exhausting, penchant for adjective-laden detail. Merritt's fondness for micro-description nicely complements the pointillistic style of Bok's illustrations.

Merritt's first fantasy story was published in 1917, "Through the Dragon Glass" in the November 14 issue of Frank Munsey's All-Story Weekly. Other short stories and serial novels followed in the Munsey magazines All-Story, Argosy All-Story, and Argosy: The People of the Pit (1918), "The Moon Pool" (1918), The Conquest of the Moon Pool (1919), "Three Lines of Old French" (1919), The Metal Monster (1920), The Face in the Abyss (1923), The Ship of Ishtar (1924), Seven Footprints to Satan (1927), The Snake Mother (1930), Burn Witch Burn! (1932), Dwellers in the Mirage (1932), and Creep, Shadow! (1934). Meanwhile, rather few of his stories appeared elsewhere: The Pool of the Stone God (in his own American Weekly, 1923), The Woman of the Wood (Weird Tales, 1926), The Metal Emperor (Science and Invention, 1927), and The Drone Man (Fantasy Magazine, 1934).

Merritt also contributed to the round robin story The Challenge from Beyond with Lovecraft, Robert E. Howard, C. L. Moore, and Frank Belknap Long.

The Fox Woman and the Blue Pagoda (1946) combined an unfinished story with a conclusion written by Merritt's friend Hannes Bok. The Fox Woman and Other Stories (1949) collected the same fragment, minus Bok's conclusion, with Merritt's short stories. The book The Black Wheel was published in 1948, after Merritt's death; it was written by Bok using previously unpublished material as well. Both these books were also illustrated by Bok and published by the small press The New Collectors Group in hardcover.

After Merritt's death, Sam Moskowitz discovered a number of poems among his papers. Though some may have been written by other authors, they were credited to Merritt when published.

Reputation
Merritt was a major influence on H. P. Lovecraft and Richard Shaver, and highly esteemed by his friend and frequent collaborator Hannes Bok, a science fiction illustrator. Karl Edward Wagner included Burn Witch Burn on his list of "The Thirteen Best Supernatural Horror Novels" in the May 1983 issue of The Twilight Zone Magazine. Michael Moorcock and James Cawthorn list The Ship of Ishtar and Dwellers in the Mirage as two of the novels in their book Fantasy: the 100 Best Books, describing the former book as Merritt "at the peak of his powers", and Merritt's work as a whole being full of "memorable images". Robert Bloch also included Burn Witch Burn on his list of favourite horror novels Gary Gygax, co-creator of the game Dungeons and Dragons, listed Merritt in "Appendix N" of the Dungeon Masters Guide and often noted that he was one of his favorite fantasy authors. In the Lensman series by E. E. Smith, there is a reference to the novel Dwellers in the Mirage in which the protagonist Kimball Kinnison references the book and a quotation from it "Luka—turn your wheel so I need not slay this woman!"

Work

Novels

 The Moon Pool (fix-up, 1919) Available online(The Moon Pool (1918) + Conquest of the Moon Pool (1919))
 The Metal Monster (1920) Available online
 The Ship of Ishtar (1924) Available online
 Seven Footprints to Satan (1927) Available online
 The Face in the Abyss (fix-up, 1931) Available online (The Face in the Abyss (1923) + The Snake Mother (1930))
 Dwellers in the Mirage (1932) Available online
 Burn, Witch, Burn! (1932) Available online
 Creep, Shadow! (1934) Available online

Short stories

 "Through The Dragon Glass" (1917) Available online
 "The People of the Pit" (1918) Available online
 "Three Lines of Old French" (1919) Available online
 "Prologue" (The Metal Monster, 1920)
 The Pool of the Stone God (as W. Fenimore, 1923) Available online
 "The Women of the Wood" (1926) Available online
 "The Drone" (also known as "The Drone Man", 1934) Available online
 "The Rhythm of the Spheres" (originally a chapter called "The Last Poet and the Robots" or "The Last Poet & the Wrongness of Space" in the 1934 round robin novel titled Cosmos, revised in 1936 as a stand-alone work) Available online

 "The Whelming of Cherkis" (excerpt from The Metal Monster, 1946)
 "When Old Gods Wake" (fragment, 1948) Available online
 "The White Road" (fragment, 1949) Available online
 "The Fox Woman" (incomplete, 1949) Available online
 "Pilgrimage, or, Obi Giese" (1985)
 "Bootleg and Witches" (fragment, 1985)
 "The Devil in the Heart" (outline, 1985)
 "The Dwellers in the Mirage" (original ending of the novel with same name, 1985)

Short story collections
 The Fox Woman and Other Stories (1949)
 The Fox Woman, 1946
 The People of the Pit, 1917
 Through the Dragon Glass, 1917
 The Drone, 1934
 The Last Poet and the Robots, 1934
 Three Lines of Old French, 1919
 The White Road, 1949
 When Old Gods Wake, 1948
 The Woman of the Wood, 1934

Poems
 "Song for Wood Horns" (also known as "The Wind Trail", 1910)
 "The Silver Birches" (1940)
 "Old Trinity Churchyard" (5 A. M. Spring) (1941)
 "Sylvane – The Silver Birches" (1973)
 "In the Cathedral" (1974)
 "2000 (The Triple Cities)" (1985)
 "Song for Wood Horn..." (1985)
 "Silvane—The Silver Birches" (1985)
 "Madonna" (1985)
 "The Ladies of the Walnut Tree (A Legend of Tuscany)" (fragments, 1985)
 "Court of the Moon" (fragment, 1985)
 "The Birth of Art" (1985)
 "L'envoi to Life" (1985)
 "Screens" (1985)
 "Sir Barnabas" (1985)
 "In the Subway" (1985)
 "Runes" (1985)
 "Eheu Fugaces..." (1985)
 "A Song for Christmas" (1985)
 "Comic Ragtime Tune" (1985)
 "Behold the Night He Cometh" (1985)
 "You Looked at Me" (1985)
 "Dream Song" (1985)
 "Castle of Dreams" (1985)
 "I Wonder Why?" (1985)
 "My Heart and I" (1985)
 Think of Me (1985)
 "The Ballad of the Cub" (1985)
 "Piddling Pete" (1985)
 "The Winged Flames" (1985)

Collaborations
 "The Challenge from Beyond" (round robin short story, with C.L. Moore, H.P. Lovecraft, Robert E. Howard, and Frank Belknap Long, 1935) Available online
 Cosmos (round robin novel, chapter 11, 1932–34) Available online
 The Fox Woman and the Blue Pagoda (novel, Hannes Bok fused Merritt's unfinished story with his own conclusion, 1946)
 The Black Wheel (novel, first seven chapters written by Merritt, completed by Hannes Bok, 1947)

Essays
 A. Merritt on Modern Witchcraft (1932)
 Concerning "Burn, Witch, Burn" (1932)
 Letter (Weird Tales, November 1935) (1935)
 Man and the Universe (1940)
 A. Merritt (1940)
 How We Found Circe (1942)
 A Tribute (1942)
 Letter to Mr. Louis De Casanova, July 23, 1931 (1985)
 Letters and Correspondence (1985)
 An Autobiography of A. Merritt (1985) with Walter Wentz
 A. Merritt—His Life and Times (1985) with Jack Chapman Miske
 What is Fantasy? (1985)
 Background of "Dwellers in the Mirage" (1985)
 Background of "Burn, Witch, Burn" (1985)
 Background of "Creep, Shadow!" (1985)
 A. Merritt's Own Selected Credo (1985)

Adaptations
Merritt's work has been adapted only rarely for films. These include:

 Seven Footprints to Satan (1929), adapted from the novel of the same name and directed by Benjamin Christensen.
 The Devil-Doll (1936), adapted from the novel Burn Witch Burn! and directed by Tod Browning.
 Muñecos infernales (1961), adapted from the novel Burn Witch Burn! (uncredited) and directed by Benito Alazraki.

See also

Notes

References

Further reading

 Foust, Ronald (1989) A. Merritt. Starmont Reader's Guide #43. 104 pages. 
 Guillaud, Lauric (1993) L'aventure mystérieuse de Poe à Merritt ou l'orphelins de Gilgamesh. Paralittératures Volume 3. Editions du CEFAL. 
 Indick, Ben P. A . Merritt: A Reappraisal in Darrell Schweitzer (ed), Discovering Classic Fantasy Fiction, Gillette NJ: Wildside Press, 1986, pp. 87.

External links

 
 
 
 
 
 
Works by Abraham Merritt at Digital Archive (Toronto Public Library)
 
 
 Abraham Merritt at Project Gutenberg Australia
 Abraham Merritt at Locus Magazine's Index to Science Fiction
  Abraham Merritt at the Index to Science Fiction Anthologies and Collections, Combined Edition
 Abraham Merritt at the FictionMags Index
 Abraham Merritt at Fantastic Fiction
 
 

 

1884 births
1943 deaths
20th-century American novelists
American fantasy writers
American male journalists
American magazine editors
American male novelists
American science fiction writers
American short story writers
Cthulhu Mythos writers
Pulp fiction writers
Science Fiction Hall of Fame inductees
People from Beverly, New Jersey
Novelists from New Jersey
American male short story writers
20th-century American male writers